Suk Sam Eng is a Cambodian politician. He is a member of the Cambodian People's Party and was elected to represent Preah Vihear in the National Assembly of Cambodia in the 2003 elections.

References

Members of the National Assembly (Cambodia)
Cambodian People's Party politicians
Living people
Year of birth missing (living people)